"Hablé de Ti" (English: I Spoke of You) is a song by Puerto Rican reggaetón singer-songwriter Yandel. It was written by Yandel and Marcos Masis, produced by Tainy and Mr. Earcandy, and released as the lead single off his second studio album, De Líder a Leyenda (2013) on July 10, 2013. The song's accompanying music video was shot in June 2013 in Los Ángeles, California and premiered on VEVO on July 29, 2013, and was directed by Carlos Pérez. The video has over 27 million views on YouTube. An English version of the song was also recorded and included on De Líder a Leyenda.

Charts

Weekly charts

Year-end charts

Release history

Certifications

See also
List of Billboard number-one Latin songs of 2013

References

2013 singles
Yandel songs
Spanish-language songs
2013 songs
Songs written by Tainy
Songs written by Yandel
Sony Music Latin singles